Tortula acaulon, formerly  Phascum cuspidatum, the cuspidate earth-moss or toothed phascum moss, is a moss with 3 mm leaves which forms green patches. It is very common and has a number of varieties in a wide range of habitats. The variety piliferum occurs on sandy soils near the sea.

References

Flora of the United Kingdom
Pottiaceae